Ivar Andreas Aasen (5 August 1813 – 23 September 1896) was a Norwegian philologist, lexicographer, playwright, and poet. He is best known for having assembled one of the two official written versions of the Norwegian language, Nynorsk, from various dialects.

Background
He was born as Iver Andreas Aasen at Åsen in Ørsta (then Ørsten), in the district of Sunnmøre, on the west coast of Norway. His father, a peasant with a small farm, Ivar Jonsson, died in 1826. The younger Ivar was brought up to farmwork, but he assiduously cultivated all his leisure in reading. An early interest of his was botany.  When he was eighteen, he opened an elementary school in his native parish. In 1833 he entered the household of Hans Conrad Thoresen, the husband of the eminent writer Magdalene Thoresen, in Herøy (then Herø), and there he picked up the elements of Latin. Gradually, and by dint of infinite patience and concentration, the young peasant mastered many languages, and began the scientific study of their structure. Ivar single-handedly created a new language for Norway to become the “literary” language.

Career

About 1846 he had freed himself from all the burden of manual labour, and could occupy his thoughts with the dialect of his native district, Sunnmøre; his first publication was a small collection of folk songs in the Sunnmøre dialect (1843). His remarkable abilities now attracted general attention, and he was helped to continue his studies undisturbed. His Grammar of the Norwegian Dialects (1848) was the result of much labour, and of journeys taken to every part of the country.  Aasen's famous Dictionary of the Norwegian Dialects appeared in its original form in 1850, and from this publication dates all the wide cultivation of the popular language in Norwegian, since Aasen really did no less than construct, out of the different materials at his disposal, a popular language or definite folke-maal (people's language) for Norway. By 1853, he had created the norm for utilizing his new language, which he called Landsmaal, meaning country language. With certain modifications, the most important of which were introduced later by Aasen himself, but also through a latter policy aiming to merge this Norwegian language with Dano-Norwegian, this language has become Nynorsk ("New Norwegian"), the second of Norway's two official languages (the other being Bokmål, the Dano-Norwegian descendant of the Danish language used in Norway in Aasen's time). An unofficial variety of Norwegian closer to Aasen's language is still found in Høgnorsk ("High Norwegian"). Today, some consider Nynorsk on equal footing with Bokmål, as Bokmål tends to be used more in radio and television and most newspapers, whereas New Norse (Nynorsk) is used equally in government work as well as approximately 17% of schools. Although it is not as common as its brother language, it needs to be looked upon as a viable language, as a large minority of Norwegians use it as their primary language including many scholars and authors.  New Norse is both a written and spoken language.

Aasen composed poems and plays in the composite dialect to show how it should be used; one of these dramas, The Heir (1855), was frequently acted, and may be considered as the pioneer of all the abundant dialect-literature of the last half-century of the 1800s, from Vinje to Garborg. In 1856, he published Norske Ordsprog, a treatise on Norwegian proverbs. Aasen continuously enlarged and improved his grammars and his dictionary. He lived very quietly in lodgings in Oslo (then Christiania), surrounded by his books and shrinking from publicity, but his name grew into wide political favour as his ideas about the language of the peasants became more and more the watch-word of the popular party. In 1864, he published his definitive grammar of Nynorsk and in 1873 he published the definitive dictionary.

Quite early in his career, in 1842, he had begun to receive a grant to enable him to give his entire attention to his philological investigations; and the Storting (Norwegian parliament), conscious of the national importance of his work, treated him in this respect with more and more generosity as he advanced in years. He continued his investigations to the last, but it may be said that, after the 1873 edition of his Dictionary (with a new title), he added but little to his stores. Ivar Aasen holds perhaps an isolated place in literary history as the one man who has invented, or at least selected and constructed, a language which has pleased so many thousands of his countrymen that they have accepted it for their schools, their sermons and their songs. He died in Christiania on 23 September 1896, and was buried with public honours.

The Ivar Aasen Centre
Ivar Aasen-tunet, an institution devoted to the Nynorsk language, opened in June 2000. The building in Ørsta was designed by Norwegian architect Sverre Fehn. Their web page includes most of Aasens' texts, numerous other examples of Nynorsk literature (in Nettbiblioteket, the Internet Library), and some articles, including some in English, about language history in Norway.

2013 Language year

Språkåret 2013 (The Language Year 2013) celebrated Ivar Aasen's 200 year anniversary, as well as the 100 year anniversary of Det Norske Teateret. The year's main focus was to celebrate linguistic diversity in Norway. In a poll released in connection with the celebration, 56% of Norwegians said they held positive views of Aasen, while 7% held negative views. On Aasen's 200 anniversary, 5 August 2013, Bergens Tidende, which is normally published mainly in Bokmål, published an edition fully in Nynorsk in memory of Aasen.

Bibliography
Aasen published a wide range of material, some of it released posthumously.

Footnotes

References
 
 
 
 
 
 
 
 
 
 
 
 
 
 norwegian journal talks about the removal of Nynorsk https://www.aftenposten.no/meninger/sid/i/8mo5GW/du-kan-ikke-velge-bort-nynorsk-bare-fordi-det-er-vanskelig-ingrid-b

External links
 Christian Sinding's musical setting of three Aasen poems Score from Sibley Music Library Digital Scores collections
 Monument honoring Ivar Aasen by   Paul Fjelde
 The Ivar Aasen Centre Official Website
 Haraldshaugen by Ivar Aasen

1813 births
1896 deaths
Norwegian philologists
Norwegian lexicographers
Norwegian language
Linguists from Norway
People from Ørsta
Translators of the Bible into Norwegian
19th-century translators
19th-century Norwegian writers
Language reformers
19th-century lexicographers